Freedom High School is a public high school established in 2004. It is located in Woodbridge in unincorporated Prince William County, Virginia, United States, and is part of Prince William County Public Schools. The school is located on 15201 Neabsco Mills Road. In May 2007, Newsweek Magazine ranked Freedom 1148th in the nation on its annual list of "Best High Schools in America." Another Freedom High School is located in adjoining Loudoun County, Virginia which shares the same mascot and colors. Freedom High School is located at  (38.621389° N, -77.2875° W). Freedom High School is home to a 9/11 memorial in the shape of a sundial.

9/11 Dedication
Freedom High School held its dedication ceremony on September 11, 2004. The school was also dedicated its memorial to the Prince William County victims of the events of September 11, 2001. As a permanent part of the high school, there is a  sundial dedicated to them. The names of the Prince William County victims are inscribed on the bricks around the sundial. Four brass plates are placed on the face of the sundial to mark the times when the four airliners struck the North and South Twin Towers, the Pentagon, and the field in Pennsylvania. Before each home football game, Freedom High School pays tribute to the victims of 9/11.

Schedule
FHS' schedule revolves around a blocked schedule which consists of "even" and "odd" days. On "even" days classes are held for periods 2, flex, 4, & 6 and on "odd" days classes are held for periods 1, 3, 5, & 7. The date does not determine whether it is an even or an odd day.

Athletics and student groups
Freedom offers many opportunities for students to participate in various sports teams and student groups to support their academics and challenge them to learn and grow outside the classroom. Such activities include:

Freedom's boys basketball have won regionals for the past three years.

Marching Band
The Freedom High School (Woodbridge, VA) Marching Eagles Band has gained a reputation as Northern Virginia's premiere multicultural high stepping marching band. They were one of two high school bands that performed during the gubernatorial inauguration of Ralph Northam in 2018.

Sports teams

Baseball
Boys Basketball varsity
Boys Freshman Basketball
Boys JV Basketball
Boys Soccer
Boys Tennis
Cheerleading
Football
Freshman Cheerleading
Girls Basketball
Girls JV Basketball
Girls Soccer
Girls Softball
Girls Tennis
JV Cheerleading
Lacrosse
Swim Team
Track & Field
Volleyball
Wrestling

Student groups

Anime Club
Book Club
Drama Club
Ecology
FBLA
Freedom Model United Nations Society
Freshman Class
Future Educators Association
Junior Class
MLK Oratory Competition
 Model United Nations 
National Honor Society
Oceanography & Aquarium
Peer Mediation
SCA
Science Club
Senior Class
Spanish Club
Sophomore Class
High Stepping Marching Eagles Band
Soulful Strut Color Guard & Majorettes

Demographics
In the 2017-2018 school year, Freedom's student body was:
29.3% Black/African American
56.4% Hispanic 
5% White
5.8% Asian
3.1% Two or More Races
.3% American Indian/Alaskan
.1% Hawaiian/Pacific Islander

Test scores
Freedom High School is not a fully accredited high school based on its performance on the Virginia SOL (Standards of Learning) tests by the Virginia Department of Education for the 2006-2007 school year.

According to the 2015 Virginia Department of Education State Accreditation and Federal Status Report, Freedom High School has a Provisionally Accredited High School status due to Graduation Rate.

Freedom High School has a continuing pledge to raising the bar on its SOL scores.

Athletics
The school's mascot is the Eagles and its sports teams currently play in the AAA Cardinal District of the AAA Northwest Region.

Notable alumni

Cameron Long (born 1988), basketball player in the Israeli Premier League

See also
 Prince William County Public Schools

References

External links
 

Public high schools in Virginia
Schools in Prince William County, Virginia
Educational institutions established in 2004
2004 establishments in Virginia
Woodbridge, Virginia